Kiss Her! (Swedish: Kyss henne!) is a 1940 Swedish comedy film directed by Weyler Hildebrand and starring Annalisa Ericson, Thor Modéen and Åke Söderblom. It is a remake of the 1933 German film And Who Is Kissing Me?.

The film's sets were designed by Arne Åkermark.

Cast

References

Bibliography
 Ulrich J. Klaus. Ergänzungen 1929/30 - 1945. Klaus-Archiv, 2006.

External links

1940 films
Swedish comedy films
1940 comedy films
1940s Swedish-language films
Films directed by Weyler Hildebrand
Remakes of German films
Swedish black-and-white films
1940s Swedish films